Homlungen Lighthouse is a fully automated leading lighthouse situated on a skerry in the archipelago municipality of Hvaler, Norway. The lighthouse and surrounding buildings, which include residences, outhouse, a well, and engine house are proposed protected as a national park.

See also
 List of lighthouses in Norway
 Lighthouses in Norway

References

External links

 Norsk Fyrhistorisk Forening 
 Norwegian Lighthouse Association

Lighthouses completed in 1867
Lighthouses in Viken
Hvaler
1867 establishments in Norway